Emil Lindholm (born 19 July 1996) is a Finnish rally driver. He is the son of former World Rally Championship driver Sebastian Lindholm. He is also the reigning champion of the Finnish Rally Championship.

Rally results

WRC results

* Season still in progress.

WRC-2 results

* Season still in progress.

WRC-3 results

JWRC results

ERC results

References

Notes

External links

 
 Emil Lindholm's e-wrc profile

1996 births
Living people
Finnish rally drivers
Sportspeople from Helsinki
World Rally Championship drivers
21st-century Finnish people
Toksport WRT drivers